StarTripper!! is an audio drama presented as a podcast following protagonist Feston Pyxis as he travels throughout space. The series was created in 2018 by Julian Mundy and published by The Whisperforge, which also published audio dramas such as ars Paradoxica, The Far Meridian, Caravan, Remarkable Provinces, and Brimstone Valley Mall. The sound design is by Mischa Stanton and Anna Rodriguez, and the theme music is by Ketsa. The two main characters, Feston and Proxy, are played by Ian McQuown and Sierra Shay respectively, with guest actors playing secondary characters.

The podcast has been described by Polygon as "hopepunk" and by the Bello Collective as "fantastical, adventurous, and fun".

Recurring Actors 

 Ian McQuown as Feston Pyxis, a former office worker who sells his belongings to buy a spaceship and fuel
 Giselle de Silva and Sierra Shay as Proxy, an AI system built into Feston's ship
 Julian Mundy as Captain Saar
 Sammi Lappin as Serena the Sapphire Blade

Accolades

Audioverse Awards

References 

2018 podcast debuts
Audio podcasts
Science fiction podcasts
Scripted podcasts